Richard Townsend Herbert (1755 – 18 December 1832) was an Irish politician.

Herbert served in the Irish House of Commons as the Member of Parliament for Kerry between 1783 and 1790. He then represented Clogher from 1790 to 1797 and Granard between January and August 1800.

References

1755 births
1832 deaths
Irish MPs 1783–1790
Irish MPs 1790–1797
Irish MPs 1798–1800
Members of the Parliament of Ireland (pre-1801) for County Kerry constituencies
Members of the Parliament of Ireland (pre-1801) for County Tyrone constituencies
Members of the Parliament of Ireland (pre-1801) for County Longford constituencies